Sartini is a surname. Notable people with the surname include:

 Antonino Sartini (1889–1954), Italian painter
 Blake L. Sartini (born 1954), American entrepreneur
 Estelle Sartini (born 1973), French rugby union player
 Sidney Sartini, member of the American Bahari (band)

See also
 Santini